From the Deeps of Space is a 1984 role-playing game adventure for Villains and Vigilantes published by Fantasy Games Unlimited.

Plot summary
From the Deeps of Space is an adventure scenario in which the player characters must stop the aliens from Capella who have invaded the village of Midville.

Reception
Craig Sheeley reviewed From the Deeps of Space in Space Gamer No. 72. Sheeley commented that "a beautiful adventure. It can be translated to any other superhero roleplaying system, too; the plot is that great. With a name like From the Deeps of Space, how can you lose?"

Reviews
Different Worlds #45 (March/April, 1987)

References

Role-playing game supplements introduced in 1984
Villains and Vigilantes adventures